Den Blå Avis was a Danish auto racing team, who competed in the FIA Formula 3000 Championship. The team has also competed in the Eurocup Formula Renault series in the 2001–2002 seasons.

History 
The Den Blå Avis stable was founded for Jason Watt in 1997. Den Blå Avis owner Karsten Ree wanted to help his compatriot, and entered into a partnership with Jan Magnussen's manager at the time, David Sears. Sears already had one of the best teams in the Formula 3000 series, Super Nova Racing, but here there was no room for the debutant Watt. The solution was Den Blå Avis a Super Nova satellite team run by Sears and financed by Ree.

The team stopped operating in the middle of the season in 2003 when the funding ran out.

Complete Formula 3000 results

References

External links
 Speedsport-magazine.com

Danish auto racing teams
International Formula 3000 teams
Formula Renault Eurocup teams
Auto racing teams established in 1997
Auto racing teams disestablished in 2003